Laughing Boy may refer to:
 Laughing Boy (painting), a 1625 painting by Frans Hals
 Laughing Boy (novel), a 1929 novel
 Laughing Boy (film), a 1934 film adaptation of the novel
 "Laughing Boy" (song), a 1963 song by Mary Wells